The Sharon, Lois & Bram Car Tunes collection is a set of mini-cassette recordings released by the Canadian children's music trio Sharon, Lois & Bram in 1989 and 1990; some were re-released in 1995. It is the largest collection of music in the trio's repertoire. The collection consists of "mid-price[d] mini-tapes for children and their families." It contains a total of eight cassettes released under their own Elephant Records label. Each cassette contains between ten and twenty songs, all from previous Sharon, Lois & Bram albums. Each cassette has a central theme.

History & releases
The cassettes were originally released after the trio's 1988 Happy Birthday album. They were available in stores in 1989 and came out in two sections. Volumes 1 through 4 were released in 1989, and volumes 5 through 8 were released in 1990. These original releases were used to promote their Sing A to Z tour and album. These included: 
Volume 1: Summertime 
Volume 2: Animals
Volume 3: Around the World
Volume 4: Sleepytime
Volume 5: Elephant Showstoppers
Volume 6: School Days
Volume 7: After School
Volume 8: Naming Names

Some of the cassettes featured dialogue between Sharon, Lois & Bram introducing the next song or saying a rhyme or riddle. These were recorded specially for the cassettes. These eight original cassettes were available only in Canada.

In 1995, with the upcoming release of their album Let's Dance! (which would become one of their best-selling albums), the trio decided to re-release four of the eight original Car Tunes cassettes to promote the album. These cassettes remained under the same name, but the volume numbers changed. They were released in partnership with Sears KidVantage program and were available at all Sears locations and stores throughout Canada and the United States. They were sold at $2.99 each and all the proceeds from the cassettes were sent to UNICEF, of which the trio have been ambassadors to since 1988.

The 1995 Sears KidVantage Car Tunes Series featured the following four albums:
Volume 1: Songs for After School
Volume 2: Songs from Around the World
Volume 3: Songs about Animals
Volume 4: Songs for Sleepytime

Packaging
The original release of the 8-volume set was designed to embrace the "car tunes" theme. It featured the front bumper of a car with the license plate containing the trio's names & the Car Tunes logo. A yield sign featured the volume number of each cassette, and a stop sign featured the number of songs found on each cassette and the name of each volume. It also contained a one-way sign listing two songs that could be found on the albums. The cover unfolded to reveal that Sharon, Lois & Bram are driving the car.

The inside flap featured a black and white collage of the trio's albums until 1988 and the text, "treat yourself to all the fun you can sing... with Sharon, Lois & Bram's full length records and tapes. Lyric sheets and activity booklets are included with LPs or blister-pack cassettes.".

The newer, four-volume Car Tunes set carried a re-vamped cover, featuring two cartoon elephants named Ollie & Ella, who were the "symbol" of the Let's Dance! album, driving a red car with music notes flying left and right.

Inside each cassette, the fold-outs contained tour dates for their Let's Dance! album and a promotional card for the album as well. It also featured a plug for kids to donate to UNICEF.

Other releases
In 1984, under Sharon, Lois & Bram's Elephant Records, a cassette titled "Car Tunes" was released featuring Sharon, Lois & Bram, The Travellers, Eric Nagler and Mike and Michelle Jackson. It was a very simple promotional cassette featuring a cartoon drawing of  a family driving in a car, with an Elephant sitting on the roof of the car. All the songs were previously recorded on the artists' previous albums.

Track listing
VOLUME 1: Summertime (1989)
"She'll Be Comin' Round the Mountain"
"Come Follow"
"Going to Kentucky"
"Take Me Out to the Ballgame"
"Long-Legged Sailor"
"Shanty Medley"
"The Ants Go Marching"
"On A Picnic We Will Go"
"Five Plump Peas"
"Savez-vous Planter Les Choux?"
"Jelly, Jelly In My Belly"
"Waddaly Atcha"

VOLUME 2: Animals (1989) / VOLUME 3: Songs About Animals (1995)
"A Riddle"
"Five Little Monkeys"
"Did You Feed My Cow?"
"Monte Sur Un Elephant"
"The Smile on the Crocodile"
"Two Little Blackbirds/Five Little Chickadees"
"Pop! Goes the Weasel"
"Elephant Rhyme/One Elephant, Deux Elephants"
"Rags"
"Tingalayo"

VOLUME 3: Around the World (1989) / VOLUME 2: Songs from Around the World (1995)
"Girl From France"
"John Jacob Jingleheimer Schmidt"
"Hold 'em Joe"
"Old King Cole/Der Rebbe Elimelech"
"Piccolomini"
"The Muffin Man"
"Sur Le Pont D'Avignon"
"The Wee Cock Sparra'"
"Un Elefante"
"It's A Small World"

VOLUME 4: Sleepytime (1989) / Volume 4: Songs for Sleepytime (1995)
"Hickory Dickory Dock"
"Go To Sleep Now, My Pumpkin"
"You Made Me A Pallet On the Floor"
"This Is the Way the Ladies Ride / Rings On Her Fingers"
"Jamais On N'a Vu"
"I Know A Little Pussy"
"That's What the Daisy Said"
"Gavotte" (J.S. Bach)
"Jack & Jill"
"Oh Dear, What Can the Matter Be?"
"Dance to Your Daddy Medley"
"There Was An Old Woman Tossed Up in A Basket"
"Star Light, Star Bright/Bye 'n Bye/Twinkle, Twinkle Little Star"
"I Had A Little Doll"

VOLUME 5: Elephant Showstoppers (1990) 
"One Elephant Went Out to Play"
"The Wheels On the Bus"
"Five Brown Buns"
"Little Liza Jane"
"Acorn Brown"
"Do Your Ears Hang Low?"
"Ballin' the Jack"
"Three Craw"
"Tommy Thumb"
"Walkin'"

VOLUME 6: School Days (1990)
"Bluebird, Bluebird"
"Rock Around the Clock"
"Jenny Jenkins"
"Food Medley"
"As I Was Going Out One Day"
"Tom, Tom the Piper's Son"
"Three Blind Mice"
"Humpty Dumpty"
"Mary Had A Little Lamb"
"Silly Names & Grazy Gibberish"
"John, John the Leprechaun"
"Old John Braddelum"
"Head & Shoulders, Baby"
"Fuzzy Wuzzy"
"Monte Sur Un Elephant"
"'A' You're Adorable"
"Way Down Yonder in the Schoolyard"

VOLUME 7: After School (1990) / VOLUME 1: Songs For After School (1995)
"Way Down Yonder in the Schoolyard"
"Bee Bee Bumblebee"
"Punchinello 47"
"Monday Night the Banjo"
"Rain Medley"
"All Hid"
"Pufferbellies"
"Tall Silk Hat"
"Walk Right In"
"Fish & Chips & Vinegar"
"One, One Cinnamon Bun"
"The Duchess At Tea"
"Cats & Mice Medley"
"Such A Gettin' Upstairs"
"Rub-A-Dub-Dub"
"Ten in the Bed"
"Hobo's Lullaby"
"Bed Bugs"

VOLUME 8: Naming Names (1990)
"Cookie Jar"
"Mango Walk"
"Charlie Over the Ocean"
"Doctor Knickerbocker"
"Jumping Joan"
"Jump Josie / Skip to My Loo"
"Terrence McDiddler"
"Noah's Old Ark"
"Matthew, Mark, Luke & John"
"Everybody Eats When They Come To My House"
"Sarah the Whale"
"Arabella Miller"
"Little Rabbit Foo-Foo"

All the songs found on these three mini-compilations can be found on Sharon, Lois & Bram's previous full-length albums, some of which include: "One Elephant, Deux Éléphants", "Stay Tuned", "Mainly Mother Goose", "Sharon, Lois & Bram's Elephant Show Record" and "Singing 'n' Swinging".

CAR TUNES CASSETTE (1984)
"Comin' Round the Mountain" (Sharon, Lois & Bram)
"Five Little Monkeys" (SL&B)
"The Smile on the Crocodile" (SL&B)
"Pallet On the Floor" (SL&B)
"Goin' to the Zoo" (The Travellers)
"'Round the World Medley" (The Travellers)
"Where is Thumbkin?" (SL&B)
"Pufferbellies" (SL&B)
"Tongue Twisters" (SL&B)
"It's A Small World" (SL&B)
"Old MacDonald" (Mike and Michelle Jackson)
"My Dad" (M&MJ)
"Waltzing Matilda" (M&MJ)
"If You're Happy & You Know It" (M&MJ)
"Newfoundland Jig Medley" (SL&B)
"Sur le Pont d'Avignon" (SL&B)
"Train Is A-Comin'" (SL&B)
"Momma Don't Allow" (Eric Nagler)
"My Aunt Came Back" (EN)
"Ice Cream Orgy Time" (EN)
"Cindy" (EN)
"Skinnamarink" (SL&B)

References

Sharon, Lois & Bram albums
1989 compilation albums
1990 compilation albums